Startin' with Me is the debut studio album by American country music artist Jake Owen, released in July 2006 (see 2006 in country music) on RCA Records Nashville. Singles released from the album include "Yee Haw", the title track, and "Something About a Woman", all of which have charted on the Billboard Hot Country Songs charts. "Yee Haw", the first of these three, reached number 16, "Startin' with Me" was the highest-peaking, at number 6, and "Something About a Woman" peaked at number 15.

Owen wrote the song "Ghosts" for Kenny Chesney. Although Chesney expressed interest in the song, he ultimately did not record it. Also included on this album is "You Can Thank Dixie", which Jake Owen recorded as a duet with former Alabama lead singer Randy Owen (no relation). Jake Owen re-recorded "Eight Second Ride" on his second album, 2009's Easy Does It, and released this rendition as a single in 2009.

Track listing

Personnel
Kenny Aronoff - drums
Pat Buchanan - electric guitar
Lisa Cochran - background vocals
Eric Darken - percussion
Larry Franklin - fiddle
Paul Franklin - dobro, steel guitar, lap steel guitar
David Grissom - electric guitar
Wes Hightower - background vocals
Kirk "Jelly Roll" Johnson - harmonica
B. James Lowry - acoustic guitar
Brent Mason - acoustic guitar, electric guitar
Jake Owen - lead vocals
Randy Owen - duet vocals on "You Can Thank Dixie"
Jimmy Ritchey - acoustic guitar, baritone guitar, electric guitar, mandolin
John Wesley Ryles - background vocals
Glenn Worf - bass guitar
Jonathan Yudkin - cello, string arrangements, viola, violin

Chart performance

Album

References

2006 debut albums
Jake Owen albums
RCA Records albums
Albums produced by Jimmy Ritchey